Oak Run Township is one of the fourteen townships of Madison County, Ohio, United States.  The 2000 census found 514 people in the township.

Geography
Located in the southern part of the county, it borders the following townships:
Fairfield Township - east
Pleasant Township - southeast
Range Township - south
Paint Township - west
Union Township - northwest

No municipalities are located in Oak Run Township.

Name and history
It is the only Oak Run Township statewide.

Government
The township is governed by a three-member board of trustees, who are elected in November of odd-numbered years to a four-year term beginning on the following January 1. Two are elected in the year after the presidential election and one is elected in the year before it. There is also an elected township fiscal officer, who serves a four-year term beginning on April 1 of the year after the election, which is held in November of the year before the presidential election. Vacancies in the fiscal officership or on the board of trustees are filled by the remaining trustees.

References

External links
County website

Townships in Madison County, Ohio
Townships in Ohio